Santa María Rupes is an escarpment on Mercury at 5.5°N, 19.7°W. It is named after Santa María, a ship used by Christopher Columbus.
The term "rupes" is the Latin word for cliff, and the name Santa María Rupes is named after the Santa María, Christopher Columbus' main ship, because all rupes on Mercury are named after the ships of famous explorers.

Scarps on Mercury